The 2017 Unibet World Grand Prix was the 20th staging of the World Grand Prix. It was held from 1–7 October 2017 at the Citywest Hotel in Dublin, Ireland.

Michael van Gerwen was the defending champion after defeating Gary Anderson 5–2 in the 2016 final, but lost to John Henderson 2–1 in the first round. This was the first time since December 2011 that van Gerwen lost in the first round of a major ranking tournament.

Daryl Gurney won his first major televised title after beating Simon Whitlock 5–4 in the final.	

For the first time in PDC history, no English player made the quarter-final stages of a televised tournament. Gurney's success also marked the first time that a televised darts tournament was won by a Northern Irish player.

Prize money
The total prize money remained at £400,000. The following is the breakdown of the fund:

Qualification
The field of 32 players was made up from the top 16 on the PDC Order of Merit on September 11 and the top 16 non-qualified players from the ProTour Order of Merit. In a change to qualification from recent years, the top two non-qualified residents of the Republic of Ireland and Northern Ireland now no longer get an automatic qualification spot. The top eight players were seeded in the tournament.

Phil Taylor (who would have been the #4 seed) opted not to enter the tournament, moving the rest of the top 16 up a place, thus meaning 17th placed Robert Thornton (the 2015 champion who would not have qualified otherwise) took his place. Number two seed Gary Anderson withdrew shortly before the tournament began due to the impending birth of his child, with Mark Webster, the highest-ranked player from the PDC Order of Merit not to have qualified, replacing him in the draw, with the seedings not being adjusted. Four players, Rob Cross, Ronny Huybrechts, Christian Kist and Richard North made their World Grand Prix debuts.

The following players qualified for the tournament:

PDC Order of Merit (1–16) (Top 8 seeded)
  Michael van Gerwen (first round)
  Gary Anderson (Withdrew) 
  Peter Wright (quarter-finals)
  Adrian Lewis (first round)
  Dave Chisnall (second round)
  Mensur Suljović (semi-finals)
  Michael Smith (first round)
  Raymond van Barneveld (quarter-finals)
  Jelle Klaasen (first round)
  James Wade (first round)
  Daryl Gurney (winner)
  Kim Huybrechts (first round)
  Ian White (first round)
  Benito van de Pas (quarter-finals)
  Simon Whitlock (runner-up)
  Robert Thornton (quarter-finals)

Pro Tour
  Rob Cross (first round)
  Alan Norris (second round)
  Joe Cullen (second round)
  Mervyn King (second round)
  Gerwyn Price (second round)
  Steve Beaton (second round)
  Kyle Anderson (first round)
  Cristo Reyes (first round)
  Darren Webster (first round)
  Stephen Bunting (first round)
  Christian Kist (first round)
  John Henderson (semi-finals)
  Justin Pipe (first round)
  Steve West (second round)
  Richard North (second round)
  Ronny Huybrechts (first round)

Draw

References

External links
Tournament website

World Grand Prix (darts)
World Grand Prix
World Grand Prix (darts)
World Grand Prix (darts)
World Grand Prix (darts), 2017